Mohammed V Square is a public square of historical and symbolic significance located in central Casablanca, Morocco.

Name 

The square is known officially as Mohammed V Square, in honor of the former king of Morocco Mohammed V. The square is known popularly as "Pigeons' Square" due to the heavy presence of pigeons. It used to be known by different names such as Main Square, Square of France, Square of Victory, Administrative Square, and Marshal Lyautey Square.

History 

It became the heart of the expanding "European city" or modern expansion of Casablanca. Resident-general Hubert Lyautey, who was from Nancy, France, had that city's 18th-century Place Stanislas serve as inspiration for Prost's urban design.

Buildings were erected around the square in the 1920s and 1930s, generally in the Moorish Revival architecture style championed by Henri Prost and his contemporaries. This style combined French design principles with traditional Mauro-Andalusian architectural traditions, which lent the colonial administrative buildings legitimacy. Clockwise from the square's eastern side: 

 Court House, architect , 1923 
  (former Military Circle, repurposed in 1956), architect Marius Boyer, 1925 
 Bank Al-Maghrib (formerly the State Bank of Morocco's Casablanca branch), architect Edmond Brion, 1937 
 Central Post Office, architect Adrien Laforgue, 1920 
 Wilaya Building (formerly City Hall), architect Marius Boyer, 1937 
 French consulate-general (former Military Commander's Mansion, repurposed in 1956), architect Albert Laprade, 1922 

On August 8, 1943, Charles de Gaulle, accompanied by General Georges Catroux, commissary of the Coordination of Muslim Affairs and governor general of Algeria, and Gabriel Puaux, resident general of France in Morocco, delivered a speech from the square, which was also broadcast by radio. 

The square was further transformed in 2020 with the construction on its western side of the Grand Theatre, designed by architect Christian de Portzamparc. On that occasion the square was entirely renovated and repaved.

Monuments and fountain

In 1976, a large circular fountain, also known as the “pigeons’ fountain”, was erected at the center of the square, west of Hassan II Avenue. In 2020 with the construction of the Grand Theater on the square’s western end, the much-liked fountain was relocated to the other side of the avenue, close to the original position of the Lyautey statue.

See also
 United Nations Square (Casablanca)
 Arab League Park
 Avenue Mohammed V, Rabat
 Mohammed V of Morocco

References

Casablanca
All stub articles